Rachid Taha Live is a live album from French-Algerian raï artist Rachid Taha, released in 2001 by Barclay. It was produced and arranged by Steve Hillage, and recorded during a concert at L'Ancienne Belgique in Brussels, March 11, 2001.

Track listing
 "Menfi" – 6:05
 "Nokta" – 6:39
 "Ida" – 6:23
 "Ya Rayah" – 8:59
 "Medina" – 6:46
 "Bent Sahra" – 9:00
 "Barra Barra" – 5:42
 "Foqt Foqt" – 6:46
 "Ala Jalkoum (with Femi Kuti)" – 5:06
 "Voilà Voilà" – 7:47
 "Garab" – 8:45

Personnel
 Rachid Taha: Composer, Primary Artist
 Abdel Abrit: Drums 
 Yves Aouizerate: Keyboards 
 Francois Delfin: Guitar 
 François Even: Bass 
 Hakim Hamadouche: Lute 
 Steve Hillage: Arranger, Composer, Guest Artist, Guitar, Mixing, Producer 
 Ahmed Khelifi: Composer 
 Femi Kuti: Guest Artist, Saxophone, Vocals 
 Hassan Lachal: Darbouka 
Source:

References

External links
Official website

Albums produced by Steve Hillage
Rachid Taha albums
2001 live albums